American Equipment Racing was a racing team that competed in the SCCA Trans-Am series in the 1980s and 1990s, and in the NASCAR Busch Grand National and Winston Cup Series during the mid-1990s.

Owned by American Equipment Company owner Buz McCall, AER competed in IMSA sports-car racing and the Trans-Am series in the 1980s and early 1990s; the team won four consecutive Trans-Am championships with drivers Scott Sharp, Jack Baldwin, and Scott Pruett from 1991 to 1994.

The team moved to NASCAR starting in 1994, competing in the Busch Grand National Series with Trans-Am Champion Jack Baldwin driving in two races, running the No. 95. Signing rookie driver John Tanner and sponsor Caterpillar Inc. for 1995, the team ran half of the 1995 season; Tanner was released after a handful of races and replaced for the majority of the team's races with Ward Burton. For 1996 AER signed 1994 Busch Series champion David Green to run for full-time in 1996. Finishing 2nd in series points, Green and AER moved up to the Winston Cup Series in 1997, where after a difficult season Green finished 37th in points. After twelve races in 1998, Green was released by the team, and a variety of drivers, including Hut Stricklin and Steve Grissom, drove for the team to finish out the year; the team closed following the 1998 season when they lost the Caterpillar sponsorship.

References

External links

1998 disestablishments in North Carolina
American auto racing teams
Defunct NASCAR teams